Hans-Erik Larsson (born 2 April 1947) is a Swedish cross-country skier. He finished 11th in the 50 km race at the 1972 Winter Olympics.

His brother Sune Larsson won a bronze medal in cross-country skiing at the 1954 World Championships.

References

External links
 

1947 births
Living people
Swedish male cross-country skiers
Olympic cross-country skiers of Sweden
Cross-country skiers at the 1972 Winter Olympics
People from Dalarna